Government Engineering College, Raipur (GEC Raipur) is a Public engineering college located in  Sejbahar, Raipur, Chhattisgarh, India. Established in 2006, it is affiliated to Chhattisgarh Swami Vivekanand Technical University, Bhilai.

Government Engineering College Raipur was established in 2006 as a centre for imparting quality Engineering Education in Chhattisgarh. It is affiliated to Chhattisgarh Swami Vivekananda Technical University Bhilai and recognized by AICTE, New Delhi. The college is functioning in a large unified academic campus.

College imparts education in degree courses of branches of Civil Engineering, Mechanical Engineering, Computer Science Engineering, Electrical and Electronics Engineering, and Electronics and Telecommunications Engineering. Various clubs have been formed at college such as AVESH Club, SAE Club, CODE Club, E-CELL Club and LOK Club under START UP CELL. There are Labs, workshops, Smart Classes, e-library, Wi-Fi facility and an auditorium.

Admission Procedure 
Government Engineering College, Raipur

Following are the details of the institute in various branches admission procedure:

Eligibility:

For admission to regular degree course in engineering :

- Passing 12th through (10+2) education system of Board of secondary education, Chhattisgarh or any recognized board/University with Physics, Mathematics as compulsory subjects along with one of the subject as Chemistry subject is essential.

- Passing cumulatively in all three main subjects i.e. Physics, Mathematics and Chemistry subject with minimum 45% marks for UR category and 40% marks for SC, ST, OBC category and PWD candidate of Chhattisgarh is essential.

Entrance Exam :

For taking Admission in Engineering Institute in Chhattisgarh Pre Engineering Test (PET) entrance exam is compulsory. the State level common entrance test conducted by Chhattisgarh Professional Examination Board, Raipur, for the purpose of determining merit list for admission to B.E. courses. Also JEE entrance marks will be accepted.

All India Quota : Not Applicable

Chhattisgarh State Quota : 100%

Only the Chhattisgarh State domicile candidates are eligible for admission under this quota. If applicants from Chhattisgarh domicile are not available, remaining seats can be converted to the other state quota. Seats in this quota shall be filled on the basis of merit in PET / JEE exam.

Lateral Entry in B.E.

The annual intake is reserved under Lateral Entry Scheme, as per the Chhattisgarh Directorate of Technical Education (CGDTE) norms of particular session. Students are eligible to get the admission under the following sub-heads:

Candidates having a 3 years Diploma in the concerned discipline with 50% marks from All India Council for Technical Education (AICTE), New Delhi recognized institutions are eligible for admission in the respective branches directly

to the 2nd year (3rd semester) of BE programme.

Candidates having a B.Sc. degree with 50% marks from any recognized university with Physics, Chemistry and Maths as compulsory subjects are also eligible for admission to BE 2nd Year directly.

The students thus admitted are required to clear foundation subjects as per the ordinance of the Chhattisgarh Swami Vivekanand Technical University, (CSVTU) Bhilai.

Reservation Policy :

The provisions of reservations for SC, ST & OBC (except creamy layers) of Chhattisgarh state shall be 12%, 32% & 14% of total seats respectively, for the purpose of admission in all Government Engineering. Remaining 42% seats shall remain unreserved.

Age :

Age Limit is Maximum 30 Years for UR and 33 Years for SC/ST/OBC/Female/PWD of Chhattisgarh.

Document Requirement

Note:- Following documents are needed at the time of admission in institutions.

(1) Income certificate for reserve category candidates.

(2) Transfer Certificate and Character Certificate from the previous institute.

(3) Gap Certificate (If there is gap during Studies).

(4) Migration Certificate (if candidate belongs to some other state board or university).

(5) AADHAR card

(6) 10th & 12th Class Marksheet

History
GEC Raipur was established in 2006 by Government of Chhattisgarh and started offering Bachelor of technology in Computer Science & Engineering, Electrical and ElectronicEngineering, Electronics and Telecommunication Engineering, Mechanical Engineering with intake capacity of 60 each. Again Civil Engineering was introduced in 2007 with an intake capacity of 40.

Departments
Department of Electronics & Telecommunication 
Department of Computer Science 
Department of Electrical & Electronics 
Department of Mechanical 
Department of Civil Engineering
Department of Humanities & Applied Sciences

Course offered
Currently the institute offers Bachelor of technology (B Tech) in the following areas:

Admissions
Admissions are made on the basis of students performance in Chhattisgarh Pre Engineering Test (CGPET) conducted by Directorate of Technical Education, Government of Chhattisgarh.

See also
Indian Institute of Technology Bhilai
Indian Institute of Management Raipur
Government Engineering College, Bilaspur
Kirodimal Institute of Technology, Raigarh
Institute of Technology, Guru Ghasidas University
National Institute of Technology, Raipur
International Institute of Information Technology, Naya Raipur

References

Government universities and colleges in India
Engineering colleges in Chhattisgarh
Education in Raipur, Chhattisgarh
Educational institutions established in 1956
1956 establishments in Madhya Pradesh